Rodolfo Andrés Torres Agudelo (born 21 March 1987 in Busbanzá) is a Colombian racing cyclist, who currently rides for Colombian amateur team Boyacá Construcciones Zea el Faro. He competed in the 2014 Giro d'Italia and 2015 Vuelta a España.

Major results

2010
 Vuelta Mexico Telmex
1st  Mountains classification
1st Stage 7 (ITT)
2011
 6th Overall Vuelta Ciclista a Costa Rica
 8th Overall Vuelta del Uruguay
2015
 1st  Mountains classification Giro del Trentino
 2nd Overall Tour de San Luis
1st  Mountains classification
 7th Overall Vuelta a Asturias
1st  Mountains classification
 7th Overall Vuelta a Burgos
 8th Overall Tour de Langkawi
 8th Overall Vuelta a Castilla y León
  Combativity award Stage 16 Vuelta a España
2016
 2nd Overall Tour of Bihor
 5th Overall Tour du Limousin
 6th Overall Tour de San Luis
 6th Giro dell'Emilia
 8th Milano–Torino
 10th Overall Settimana Internazionale di Coppi e Bartali
2017
 1st  Overall Tour of Bihor
1st Stage 2a
 3rd Overall Vuelta a San Juan
 5th Overall Settimana Internazionale di Coppi e Bartali
 5th Giro dell'Appennino
 10th Overall Tour of the Alps
 10th Overall Vuelta a Castilla y León
2018
 3rd Overall Vuelta a San Juan
2019
 9th Overall Tour of Taiyuan
 10th Overall Tour of Romania

Grand Tour general classification results timeline

References

External links
 

1987 births
Living people
Colombian male cyclists
Sportspeople from Boyacá Department
21st-century Colombian people